Abadeh Tashk Rural District is a rural district (dehestan) in Bakhtegan County, Fars Province, Iran. At the 2006 census, its population was 4,733, in 1,227 families.  The rural district has 8 villages.

References 

Rural Districts of Fars Province
Neyriz County